Nancy Reno (born December 24, 1965, in Glen Ellyn, Illinois) is a retired female beach volleyball player from the United States. She won the bronze medal at the 1997 World Championships in Los Angeles, California, partnering Karolyn Kirby. The pair also won the tournament at the 1992 Olympics, at which beach volleyball was a demonstration sport. Reno finished in fifth place at the inaugural Olympic Beach Volleyball Competition at the 1996 Summer Olympics alongside Holly McPeak.

References

External links
 
 
 

1965 births
Living people
American women's beach volleyball players
Beach volleyball players at the 1996 Summer Olympics
Olympic beach volleyball players of the United States
Stanford Cardinal women's volleyball players
People from Glen Ellyn, Illinois
20th-century American women